You Never Know may refer to:

 You Never Know (musical), 1938
 You Never Know (album), by drummer Peter Erskine featuring pianist John Taylor and bassist Palle Danielsson, 1992
 "You Never Know" (Solid Base song), 1996
 "You Never Know" (Stan Walker song), 2016
 "You Never Know", song by Blackpink from The Album, 2020
 "You Never Know", song by Dave Matthews Band from Busted Stuff, 2002
 "You Never Know", song by Goldfrapp from Supernature, 2005
 "You Never Know", song by Hanson from This Time Around, 2000
 "You Never Know", song by Sara Evans from Slow Me Down, 2014

See also
 Never Know (disambiguation)
 You'll Never Know (disambiguation)